Morgan City is a small city in St. Mary and lower St. Martin parishes in the U.S. State of Louisiana in the Acadiana region. The population was 12,404 at the 2010 census.

Morgan City sits on the banks of the Atchafalaya River. The town was originally named "Tiger Island" by surveyors appointed by U.S. Secretary of War John Calhoun, because of a particular type of wild cat seen in the area. It was later changed for a time to "Brashear City," named after Walter Brashear, a prominent Kentucky physician who had purchased large tracts of land and acquired numerous sugar mills in the area.  It was incorporated in 1860.

History

Capture of Brashear City
During the American Civil War, the Star Fort of Fort Brashear was the larger of two works erected by the Union Army occupying the city to defend a Federal military depot and the town. During the Bayou Teche Campaign, on the night of June 22, 1863, 325 Confederates of Gen. A. A. Mouton's command, led by Major Sherod Hunter, landed their skiffs and flats in the rear of the town. Attacking the next day, they surprised and captured the city, taking 1,300 Union prisoners, 11 heavy siege guns, 2,500 stands of rifles, immense quantities of quartermaster, commissary and ordnance stores. They also captured 2,000 African Americans, between 200 and 300 wagons and tents, all while suffering losses of only 3 killed, 18 wounded.

Morgan City

In 1876, the community's name was changed to Morgan City in tribute to Charles Morgan, a rail and steamship magnate who first dredged the Atchafalaya Bay Ship Channel to accommodate ocean-going vessels.

On September 11, 1961, an F2 tornado struck the city, causing heavy damage to the city and injuring 16 people.

On October 28, 1985, Hurricane Juan (not to be confused with the 2003 storm of the same name) made landfall near Morgan City, flooding many parts of the city. The storm then looped offshore and came onshore again in Alabama.

On August 26, 1992, Hurricane Andrew came ashore  to the southwest of Morgan City. Andrew was the second most destructive hurricane in U.S. history, crossing Florida and then regaining strength in the Gulf of Mexico before it struck Louisiana.

In 2019, Morgan City and the surrounding area were selected as a setting for the paranormal-themed reality TV show Ghosts of Morgan City, broadcast on the Travel Channel.
On July 13, 2019 Hurricane Barry made landfall west of Morgan City as a Category 1 Hurricane on the Saffir Simpson Scale.

Agricultural
A type of Blackberry deemed the Youngberry was developed by B.M. Young in 1905 in Morgan City, as a hybrid between a variety of blackberries. The Youngberry is a cross between Luther Burbank's Phenomenal Berry and the Austin-Mayes Dewberry, a trailing Blackberry. The Youngberry was introduced commercially in 1926 and quickly came to rival the Loganberry. The Youngberry had excellent qualities, such as taste and high yields and it soon replaced the Loganberry of California.

Geography

The northeastern border of Morgan City is at the lower St. Martin Parish line via Louisiana Highway 70.

U.S. Highway 90 (future Interstate 49) and Louisiana Highway 182 both pass through the city, both heading west  to Lafayette. U.S. 90 is a freeway between Morgan City and the Houma area with the route planned to become a section of future Interstate 49.

Morgan City is served by the Harry P. Williams Memorial Airport, a general aviation airfield located near the U.S. 90 four lane highway in nearby Patterson, Louisiana.

If the Mississippi River were to experience a major course change in the vicinity of the Old River Control Structure or Morganza Spillway, the main channel of the river would likely then enter the Gulf of Mexico near Morgan City instead of New Orleans.

Climate

Demographics

As of the 2020 United States census, there were 11,472 people, 4,732 households, and 2,492 families residing in the city. As of the census of 2000, there were 12,703 people, 5,037 households, and 3,394 families residing in the city.

In 2000, the racial makeup of the city was 71.28% White, 23.90% African American, 0.91% American Indian, 1.02% Asian, 0.01% Pacific Islander, 1.18% from other races, and 1.69% from two or more races. Hispanic of any race were 3.37% of the population. By 2020, its racial and ethnic makeup was 57.88% non-Hispanic white, 21.88% African American, 0.91% Native American, 1.63% Asian, 0.01% Pacific Islander, 4.18% other or multiracial, and 13.51% Hispanic or Latino of any race.

In 2000, there were 5,037 households, out of which 31.2% had children under the age of 18 living with them, 47.0% were married couples living together, 15.8% had a female householder with no husband present, and 32.6% were non-families. 28.0% of all households were made up of individuals, and 10.8% had someone living alone who was 65 years of age or older. The average household size was 2.48 and the average family size was 3.04.

In the city, the population was spread out, with 26.4% under the age of 18, 8.7% from 18 to 24, 27.7% from 25 to 44, 23.3% from 45 to 64, and 13.9% who were 65 years of age or older. The median age was 36 years. For every 100 females, there were 93.0 males. For every 100 females age 18 and over, there were 91.8 males.

The median income for a household in the city was $28,324, and the median income for a family was $36,196. Males had a median income of $31,712 versus $19,550 for females. The per capita income for the city was $14,577. About 17.7% of families and 20.7% of the population were below the poverty line, including 27.3% of those under age 18 and 17.7% of those age 65 or over.

Education
St. Mary Parish School Board operates public schools:
 Morgan City High School
 Morgan City Junior High School
Elementary schools:
 J. B. Maitland Elementary School
 M. E. Norman Elementary School 
 M. D. Shannon Elementary School 
 Wyandotte Elementary School

There is a private Catholic Pre-k through grade 12 school, Central Catholic High School.

Notable people

 Bill Burgo (1919–1988), baseball player
 Carla Blanchard Dartez, former state representative
 Charles deGravelles (1913–2008), Louisiana State Republican chairman from 1968 to 1972
 Mo B. Dick (Born Raymond E Poole, 1965), music producer
 Eddie Dyer (1899–1964), Major League Baseball player, St. Louis Cardinals pitcher
 Sid Gautreaux (1912–1980), baseball player
 Anthony Guarisco, Jr. (born 1938), state senator from 1976 to 1988; lawyer and real estate businessman, now in Baton Rouge
 Mark Hall (born 1965), football player
 René Hall (1912–1988), session guitarist
 Burt Lancon, figure skater in the 1984 Winter Olympics
 Geronimo Pratt (1947–2011), Black Panther
 Sam Seamans (born 1967), Reformed Episcopal Church Bishop, former Southern Baptist

References

External links

City of Morgan City official website

 
Cities in Louisiana
Cities in St. Mary Parish, Louisiana
Populated places established in 1860
1860 establishments in Louisiana